Hadja Cissé (born 7 March 1991) is a Senegalese professional handball player.

Biography 
Cissé has competed most of her career in the French Women's Handball Championship representing various clubs including Yutz HBF, Abbeville HBF, AS Cannes, Fleury Loiret HB and OGC Nice Côte d'Azur Handball. She was part of the 2016 Coupe de la Ligue Française winners Fleury Loiret HB squad. She also played for the Norwegian club Sola HK between 2017 and 2018.

Internationally Cisse has played for the Senegal women's national handball team, winning a bronze medal at the 2015 African Games and a silver medal at the 2018 African Women's Handball Championship.

Cissé played in the left backcourt position for the French handball team HBCSA Porte du Hainaut but left the club in 2019 after 11 appearances.

References 

1991 births
Living people
Senegalese female handball players
Senegalese sportswomen
African Games medalists in handball
African Games bronze medalists for Senegal
Competitors at the 2015 African Games